Stenoma ybyrajubu is a moth in the family Depressariidae. It was described by Vitor O. Becker in 1971. It is found in Brazil.

References

Moths described in 1971
Stenoma